Argentopyge is a genus of trilobite in the order Phacopida, which existed in what is now Argentina. It was described by Baldis in 1972, and the type species is Argentopyge argentina.

References

External links
 Argentopyge at the Paleobiology Database

Fossils of Argentina
Dalmanitidae